Bowling Green School is a Pre-K through 12th Grade, college prep, private school located in Franklinton, Louisiana, United States, in Washington parish.

The school colors are Green, Gold and White. The school mascot is the Buccaneer.

History

The school was founded in 1969 as a segregation academy by white parents seeking to avoid racially integrated public schools. In 1975, a federal court ordered the state of Louisiana to stop providing textbooks and school bus service to Bowling Green school. The court ruled that substantial state assistance to the racially segregated Bowling Green School violated of the equal protection clause of the Fourteenth Amendment  

In 1999, Bowling Green enrolled its first black student. The same year, the school applied to state of Louisiana Department of Education to be certified as no longer racially discriminatory thus make its graduates eligible for the TOPS scholarship program. After the federal Justice Department directed the state not to certify the school as nondiscriminatory, Bowling Green School filed suit in federal court. The district court found that Bowling Green had not demonstrated a good faith commitment to eliminating the vestiges of past discrimination and has not made meaningful progress toward becoming a nondiscriminatory school. In 2004, the ruling was upheld by the 5th Circuit Court of Appeals

Statistics 
Statistics from National Center for Education Statistics and are based on the 2003–2004 school year.

Characteristics 

{| border=0 cellspacing=0 cellpadding=1
| Locale  
| Small Town
|-
| Type
| Regular elementary or secondary
|-
| Affiliation
| Nonsectarian
|-
| Student Body 
| Coed
|-
| Days in School Year
| 180
|-
| Hours in School Day
| 6.9
|-
| Library
| no
|-
| Total Teachers (FTE)
| 22.3
|-
| Total Students
| 352
|-
| Students K-12
| 328
|-
| Student/Teacher Ratio
| 14.7
|}

Enrollment by race/ethnicity 

{| border=0 cellspacing=0 cellpadding=1
| American Indian/Alaskan Native
| 0
|-
| Asian/Pacific Islander
| 0
|-
| Hispanic
| 4
|-
| Black, non-Hispanic
| 3
|-
| White, non-Hispanic
| 245
|}

Athletics

Championships
Football championships
(2) Championships: 1983, 1997

References

External links
Midsouth Association of Independent Schools

Private elementary schools in Louisiana
Private middle schools in Louisiana
Private high schools in Louisiana
Preparatory schools in Louisiana
Schools in Washington Parish, Louisiana
Segregation academies in Louisiana